Rachel Elizabeth Boston (born May 9, 1982) is an American actress and producer. Boston has had leading roles in a number of independent films, and was a regular cast member in several television series. She starred in the NBC drama series, American Dreams as Beth Mason from 2002 to 2005, in the short-lived CBS sitcom The Ex List in 2008, and on the USA Network series In Plain Sight from 2008 to 2012. From 2013 to 2014, Boston starred as Ingrid Beauchamp in the Lifetime fantasy-drama series, Witches of East End.

Early life
Was born in Chattanooga, Tennessee, to William Terry Boston and Brenda Billingsley Boston.  Her father was executive vice president of power system operations for the Tennessee Valley Authority. She grew up in Signal Mountain, Tennessee, before moving to New York City at the age of seventeen to attend New York University. She was Miss Tennessee Teen USA in 1999, placing in the Top 10 at the national pageant.

Career
Boston starred in the NBC series American Dreams, which aired from 2002 to 2005. She portrayed the character Beth Pryor (née Mason), the wife of the oldest son of the Pryor family, around whom the series was centered. She has made guest appearances in other series such as The Closer, Las Vegas, The Daily Show, Curb Your Enthusiasm, Grey's Anatomy, Rules of Engagement, and Crossing Jordan, and NCIS.

Boston landed the lead role on ABC's Ric Swartzlander comedy pilot The News (2007). The show was set in a chaotic Phoenix television newsroom. Boston played a rising star at the station who had recently been promoted to executive producer of all news programs. Boston also starred with Donal Logue in the Fox pilot "Hackett", directed by Barry Sonnenfeld, and starred with Ed O'Neill and Christine Baranski in the CBS pilot Inseparable.

Boston starred as Daphne Bloom in the short-lived CBS series The Ex List. In that same year she also guest starred on NBC's ER playing an American soldier. She filmed Ghosts of Girlfriends Past with Matthew McConaughey and Jennifer Garner in February 2008. She has also filmed 500 Days of Summer with Joseph Gordon-Levitt and Zooey Deschanel in spring 2008.

In early 2011, Boston joined the cast of USA Network's hit series In Plain Sight, where she played Abigail Chaffee, an Albuquerque Police Detective and the love interest of Marshall Mann (Frederick Weller). For the fifth and final season, Boston continued her role as a series regular.

For her role opposite Noah Bean in the independent feature The Pill, Boston garnered rave reviews on the festival circuit and earned accolades including the Best Actress Award from the San Diego Film Festival, the Stargazer Award from the Gen Art Film Festival, and the Emerging Artist Award from the Big Apple Film Festival.

Boston was the executive producer for the independent film Black Marigolds, and also starred in the film, which reunited her with her costar from The Pill, Noah Bean. The film was shot over a 2-week span in the Palomar Mountain Range of Southern California.

In 2012, Boston starred in the feature film It's a Disaster alongside Julia Stiles and America Ferrera.  In the fall of 2012, Boston would then be cast as one of the leads in the Lifetime fantasy-drama series Witches of East End, based on a novel of the same name by Melissa de la Cruz, opposite Julia Ormond, Jenna Dewan and Mädchen Amick.  The show debuted on October 6, 2013.

During her tenure on Witches of East End, she was cast in the original independent romantic comedy A Ring by Spring, a Hallmark original film, directed by Kristoffer Tabori.  Shortly thereafter she was cast in Hallmark Movies & Mysteries' original telefilm A Gift of Miracles, opposite Jesse Moss and Rita Moreno.

Shortly after Lifetime's cancellation of Witches of East End, Boston signed on to Hallmark Channel's original telefim, Ice Sculpture Christmas, a part of Hallmark's 2015 Countdown to Christmas event.  In April 2016, Boston completed work on Hallmark Channel'''s original telefilm Stop the Wedding, co-starring Niall Matter, Alan Thicke, Lini Evans and Teryl Rothery.  At the end of 2016, Boston announced a partnership with Hallmark and author de la Cruz on a new original movie, Christmas in Angel Falls, which is about an angel who falls in love during the Christmas season.

Between 2018 and 2019, Rachel would sign on to her first theatrical leading role in 6 years, in the film I Hate Kids'' opposite Tom Everett Scott.  In November 2018, Rachel would guest on the ABC drama, the Good Doctor as Claire's college roommate and friend, Kayla, who is seeking treatment for her cancer.

Filmography

Film

Television

References

External links

 
 

1982 births
Actresses from Tennessee
American television actresses
Living people
1999 beauty pageant contestants
20th-century Miss Teen USA delegates
People from Chattanooga, Tennessee
21st-century American actresses
People from Signal Mountain, Tennessee